Halifax is the capital and largest municipality of the Canadian province of Nova Scotia, and the largest municipality in Atlantic Canada. Halifax is one of Canada's fastest growing municipalities, and as of 2022, it is estimated that the CMA population of Halifax was 480,582, with 348,634 people in its urban area. The regional municipality consists of four former municipalities that were amalgamated in 1996: Halifax, Dartmouth, Bedford, and Halifax County.

Halifax is a major economic centre in Atlantic Canada, with a large concentration of government services and private sector companies. Major employers and economic generators include the Department of National Defence, Dalhousie University, Nova Scotia Health Authority, Saint Mary's University, the Halifax Shipyard, various levels of government, and the Port of Halifax. Agriculture, fishing, mining, forestry, and natural gas extraction are major resource industries found in the rural areas of the municipality.

History

Halifax is located within Miꞌkmaꞌki, the traditional ancestral lands of the Miꞌkmaq peoples. The Mi'kmaq have resided in Nova Scotia, New Brunswick, and Prince Edward Island since prior to European landings in North America in the 1400s and 1500s to set up fisheries. At the time of Confederation of Canada, about 1000 Mi’kmaq lived in the Colony of Nova Scotia.
The Mi'kmaq name for Halifax is Kjipuktuk, pronounced "che-book-took". The name means "Great Harbour" in the Mi'kmaq language.

The first permanent European settlement in the region was on the Halifax Peninsula. The establishment of the Town of Halifax, named after the 2nd Earl of Halifax, in 1749 led to the colonial capital being transferred from Annapolis Royal.

The establishment of Halifax marked the beginning of Father Le Loutre's War. The war began when Edward Cornwallis arrived to establish Halifax with 13 transports and a sloop of war on June 21, 1749. By unilaterally establishing Halifax, the British were violating earlier treaties with the Mi'kmaq (1726), which were signed after Father Rale's War. Cornwallis brought along 1,176 settlers and their families. To guard against Mi'kmaq, Acadian and French attacks on the new Protestant settlements, British fortifications were erected in Halifax (Citadel Hill) (1749), Bedford (Fort Sackville) (1749), Dartmouth (1750), and Lawrencetown (1754), all areas within the modern-day Regional Municipality. St. Margaret's Bay was first settled by French-speaking Foreign Protestants at French Village, Nova Scotia who migrated from Lunenburg, Nova Scotia during the American Revolution.

The resulting explosion, the Halifax Explosion, devastated the Richmond District of Halifax, killing approximately 2,000 people and injuring nearly 9,000 others. The blast was the largest artificial explosion before the development of nuclear weapons. Significant aid came from Boston, strengthening the bond between the two coastal cities.

The four municipalities in the Halifax urban area had been coordinating service delivery through the Metropolitan Authority since the late 1970s, but remained independent towns and cities until April 1, 1996, when the provincial government amalgamated all municipal governments within Halifax County to create the Halifax Regional Municipality. The municipal boundary thus now includes all of Halifax County except for several First Nation reserves.

Since amalgamation, the region has officially been known as the Halifax Regional Municipality (HRM), although "Halifax" has remained in common usage for brevity. On April 15, 2014, the regional council approved the implementation of a new branding campaign for the region developed by the local firm Revolve Marketing. The campaign would see the region referred to in promotional materials simply as "Halifax," although "Halifax Regional Municipality" would remain the region's official name. The proposed rebranding was met with mixed reaction from residents, some of whom felt that the change would alienate other communities in the municipality through a perception that the marketing scheme would focus on Metropolitan Halifax only, while others expressed relief that the longer formal name would no longer be primary. Mayor Mike Savage defended the decision, stating: "I'm a Westphal guy, I'm a Dartmouth man, but Halifax is my city, we're all part of Halifax. Why does that matter? Because when I go and travel on behalf of this municipality, there isn't a person out there who really cares what HRM means."

Geography

Climate
Halifax has a humid continental climate (Köppen Dfb), bordering on an oceanic climate (Cfb), with warm summers and relatively mild winters, which is due to Gulf Stream moderation. The sea heavily influences the climate of the area, causing significant seasonal lag in summer, with August being significantly warmer than June and with September being the third mildest month in terms of mean temperature. The January mean is only  colder than the isotherm for the oceanic climate.

Precipitation is high year-round. Winter features a mix of rain, freezing rain and snow with frequent freeze-thaw cycles. Snowfall is heavy in winter, but snow cover is usually patchy owing to the frequent freeze-thaw cycles, which melt accumulated snow. Some winters feature colder temperatures and fewer freeze-thaw cycles; the most recent of which being the winter of 2014–2015, which was the coldest, snowiest and stormiest in about a century. Spring is often wet and cool and arrives much later than in areas of Canada at similar latitudes, due to cooler sea temperatures. Summers are mild and pleasant, with hot and humid conditions very infrequent. Warm, pleasant conditions often extend well into September, sometimes into mid-October. Average monthly precipitation is highest from November to February due to intense late-fall to winter storms migrating from the Northeastern U.S., and lowest in summer, with August being the year's warmest and driest month on average. Halifax can sometimes receive hurricanes, mostly between August and October. An example is when Hurricane Juan, a category 2 storm, hit in September 2003 and caused considerable damage to the region. Hurricane Earl grazed the coast as a category 1 storm in 2010. In 2019, Hurricane Dorian made landfall just south of Halifax as a post-tropical storm with an intensity equivalent to a category 2 hurricane and caused significant damage across Nova Scotia. Atlantic sea surface temperatures have risen in recent years, making Halifax and the coast of Nova Scotia somewhat more susceptible to hurricanes than the area had been in the past.

The March 2012 North American heat wave brought unusually high temperatures to the municipality of Halifax. In spite of the possibility of high temperatures, in a normal year there is only three days that go above . Halifax also has a modest frost count by Canadian standards due to the maritime influence, averaging 131 air frosts and 49 full days below freezing annually. On average the frost-free period is 182 days, ranging from May 1 to October 31.

Metropolitan landscape
As of the 2021 Canadian Census, the Halifax Census Metropolitan Area (Metropolitan Halifax) is coterminous with the Municipality of Halifax and the Municipality of East Hants. The total land area of Metropolitan Halifax is 727,622 hectares (7,276.22 km2).

The metropolitan area grew between the 2016 Canadian Census and the 2021 Canadian Census. Before the 2021 Canadian Census, Metropolitan Halifax covered 549,631 hectares (5,496.31 km2). After the addition of the Municipality of East Hants, the metropolitan area's land area expanded by 177,991 hectares (1,779.91 km2) to its current land area.

Municipal landscape

Halifax has two distinct areas; its rural area and its urban area. Since 1 April 1996, the entirety of the County of Halifax and all of its places (cities, suburbs, towns, and villages) were turned into communities of a larger single-tier municipality called Halifax Regional Municipality.

The nearest point of land to Sable Island is not in HRM, but rather in adjacent Guysborough County. However, Sable Island is considered part of District 7 of the Halifax Regional Council.

The coast is mostly rock with small isolated sand beaches in sheltered bays. The largest coastal features include St. Margarets Bay, Halifax Harbour/Bedford Basin, Cole Harbour, Musquodoboit Harbour, Jeddore Harbour, Ship Harbour, Sheet Harbour, and Ecum Secum Harbour. The municipality's topography spans from lush farmland in the Musquodoboit Valley to rocky and heavily forested rolling hills. It includes a number of islands and peninsulas, among them McNabs Island, Beaver Island, Melville Island, Deadman's Island and Sable Island.

Regional Centre
The Halifax Regional Centre includes the Halifax Peninsula, and Dartmouth inside the Circumferential Highway. The new inner-urban-area covers 3,300 hectares (33 km2), and houses 96,619 people in 55,332 dwelling units as of the 2016 Census. The Regional Centre has many public services within its boundaries, and it hosts large entertainment venues (Scotiabank Centre), and major hospitals (Dartmouth General Hospital, the QEII Health Sciences Centre, and IWK Health Centre).

Communities and neighbourhoods

Halifax is geographically large, and there are over 200 official communities-and-neighbourhoods within the municipality. They vary from rural-to-urban. The former town of Bedford, and the former-cities of Dartmouth-and-Halifax have maintained their original geographic names. Furthermore, communities that were suburban, or even rural before-1996, now have become more urban and have attained community status (e.g. Cole Harbour, Lower Sackville, Spryfield, et cetera). These community names are used on survey and mapping documents, for 9-1-1 service, municipal planning, and postal service.

Prior to the amalgamation of Halifax in 1996, and since its restructure as a Municipality, the growth of Halifax has not only been sustained, but has gradually increased. Many of the present-day-communities within the conurbation have morphed from being primarily rural in the recent-past, to now primarily urban. With the demographic change-and-growth of many communities within urban Halifax, their function-and-role within the conurbation has changed. With this continuous growth, many of the current communities have developed de facto business districts where residents of their respective communities (and their respective environs) can access needs-and-products that previously would be attained by travelling elsewhere (e.g. to Downtown Dartmouth or to Downtown Halifax).

Community planning areas

Currently, the municipality is divided into 21 community planning areas which are further divided into neighbourhoods. The regional municipality has taken steps to reduce duplicate street names for its 9-1-1 emergency dispatch services; at the time of amalgamation, some street names were duplicated several times throughout the municipality.

Current planning areas:
Beaver Bank, Hammonds Plains, and Upper Sackville
Bedford
Cole Harbour/Westphal
Dartmouth
Eastern Passage/Cow Bay
Eastern Shore (East)
Eastern Shore (West)
Downtown Halifax
Halifax
Lawrencetown
Musquodoboit Valley/Dutch Settlement
North Preston, Lake Major, Lake Loon, Cherry Brook, and East Preston
Planning Districts 1 & 3 (St. Margaret's Bay)
Planning District 4 (Prospect)
Planning District 5 (Chebucto Peninsula)
Planning Districts 8 & 9 (Lake Echo/Porters Lake)
Planning Districts 14 & 17 (Shubenacadie Lakes)
Regional Centre Plan Area
Sackville
Sackville Drive
Timberlea/Lakeside/Beechville

Rural landscape
Halifax is centred on the urban core and surrounded by areas of decreasing population density. Rural areas lie to the east, west and north of the urban core. The Atlantic Ocean lies to the south. Certain rural communities on the urban fringe function as suburban or exurban areas, with the majority of those residents commuting to and working in the urban core.

Farther away, rural communities in the municipality function like any resource-based area in Nova Scotia, being sparsely populated and their local economies based on four major resource industries: agriculture, in the Musquodoboit Valley, fishing, along the coast, mining, in the Musquodoboit Valley and in Moose River Gold Mines and forestry, in most areas outside the urban core. Also, the tourism industry is beginning to change how some rural communities in Halifax function, particularly in communities such as Hubbards, Peggys Cove, with its notable lighthouse and Lawrencetown, with Lawrencetown Beach. There are two other large beaches along the coast, Martinique Beach, near Musquodoboit Harbour and Taylor Head Beach, located in Spry Bay, within the boundaries of Taylor Head Provincial Park.

The northeastern area of the municipality, centred on Sheet Harbour and the Musquodoboit Valley, is completely rural, with the area sharing more in common with the adjacent rural areas of neighbouring Guysborough, Pictou and Colchester counties. Most economic activity in the Musquodoboit Valley is based on agriculture, as it is the largest farming district in the municipality. Most coastal communities are based on the fishing industry. Forestry is active in this area as well. It is also prevalent in the Musquodoboit Valley, but it takes a backseat to the more prominent agricultural industry.

Urban landscape

At 23,829 hectares (238.29 km2), Halifax's urban area (defined as population centre by Statistics Canada) is less-than five-percent of the municipal land area. The area surrounds Halifax Harbour and its main centres are Bedford, Dartmouth, and Halifax (and their respective environs).

Between the 2016 Canadian Census and the 2021 Canadian Census, the built-up area of Halifax grew by 357 hectares (3.57 km2) from 23,472 hectares (234.72 km2) hectares in 2016 to 23,829 hectares (238.29 km2) in 2021.

Culture

Halifax is a major cultural centre within the Atlantic provinces. The municipality has maintained many of its maritime and military traditions, while opening itself to a growing multicultural population. The municipality's urban core also benefits from a large population of post-secondary students who strongly influence the local cultural scene. Halifax has a number of art galleries, theatres and museums, as well as most of the region's national-quality sports and entertainment facilities. Halifax is also the home to many of the region's major cultural attractions, such as Halifax Pop Explosion, Symphony Nova Scotia, the Art Gallery of Nova Scotia, The Khyber, the Maritime Museum of the Atlantic and the Neptune Theatre. The region is noted for the strength of its music scene and nightlife, especially within the urban communities. See List of musical groups from Halifax, Nova Scotia for a partial list.

Halifax hosts a wide variety of festivals that take place throughout the year, including; the largest Canada Day celebration east of Ottawa, the Atlantic Film Festival, the Halifax International Busker Festival, Greekfest, Atlantic Jazz Festival, the Multicultural Festival, Natal Day, Nocturne Festival, the Halifax Pop Explosion, periodic Tall Ship events, the Royal Nova Scotia International Tattoo, and Shakespeare by the Sea—to name a few. Halifax Pride is the largest LGBT event in Atlantic Canada and one of the largest in the country. Many of Halifax's festivals and annual events have become world-renowned over the past several years.

Halifax is home to many performance venues, namely the Music Room, the Neptune Theatre, and Rebecca Cohn Auditorium. The Neptune Theatre, a 43-year-old establishment located on Argyle Street, is Halifax's largest theatre. It performs an assortment of professionally produced plays year-round. The Shakespeare by the Sea theatre company performs at nearby Point Pleasant Park. Eastern Front Theatre performs at Alderney Landing in Downtown Dartmouth which can easily be accessed via the Halifax Transit ferry service. There are smaller performance venues at the Halifax Central Library, Citadel High School (Spatz Theatre), and Halifax West High School (Bella Rose Arts Centre).

Halifax has also become a significant film production centre, with many American and Canadian filmmakers using the streetscapes, often to stand in for other cities that are more expensive to work in. The Canadian Broadcasting Corporation has its Atlantic Canada production centres (radio and television) based in Halifax, and quite a number of radio and television programs are made in the region for national broadcast. In 2020, filming began on the series Pub Crawl, which explores the historically significant bars of Halifax.

The new Halifax Central Library on Spring Garden Road has received accolades for its architecture and has been described as a new cultural locus, offering many community facilities including a 300-seat auditorium.

Architecture

Halifax's urban core is home to a number of regional landmark buildings and retains significant historic buildings and districts. Downtown office towers are overlooked by the fortress of Citadel Hill with its iconic Halifax Town Clock.

The architecture of Halifax's South End is renowned for its grand Victorian houses while the West End and North End, Halifax have many blocks of well-preserved wooden residential houses with notable features such as the "Halifax Porch". Dalhousie University's campus is often featured in films and documentaries. Surrounding areas of the municipality, including Dartmouth and Bedford, also possess their share of historic neighbourhoods and properties.

The urban core is home to several blocks of typical North American high-rise office buildings; however, segments of the downtown are governed by height restrictions, known as "view planes legislation", which prevent buildings from obstructing certain sight lines between Citadel Hill and the Halifax Harbour. This has resulted in some modern high rises being built at unusual angles or locations.

Public spaces

The Halifax area has a variety of public spaces, ranging from urban gardens, public squares, expansive forested parks, and historic sites. The original grid plan devised when Halifax was founded in 1749 included a central military parade square, the Grand Parade. The square hosts the City Hall at one end, and is a popular site for concerts, political demonstrations, as well as the annual Remembrance Day ceremony at the central cenotaph.

The Halifax Common, granted for the use of citizens in 1763, is Canada's oldest public park. Centrally located on the Halifax peninsula, the wide fields are a popular location for sports. The slopes of Citadel Hill, overlooking downtown, are favoured by sunbathers and kite-flyers. The Halifax Public Gardens, a short walk away, are Victorian era public gardens formally established in 1867 and designated a National Historic Site in 1984. Victoria Park, across the street, contains various monuments and statues erected by the North British Society, as well as a fountain. In contrast to the urban parks, the expansive Point Pleasant Park at the southern tip of the peninsula is heavily forested and contains the remains of numerous British fortifications.

Located on the opposite side of the harbour, the Dartmouth Commons is a large park next to Downtown Dartmouth laid out in the 1700s. It is home to the Leighton Dillman gardens and various sports grounds. Nearby, the Dartmouth waterfront trail stretches from Downtown Dartmouth to Woodside. Among residents of central Dartmouth, the area around Sullivan's Pond and Lake Banook is popular for strolling and paddling. The forested Shubie Park, through which the historic Shubenacadie Canal runs, is a major park in suburban Dartmouth.

Mainland Halifax is home to several significant parks, including Sir Sandford Fleming Park, gifted to the people of Halifax by Sir Sandford Fleming. It houses the Dingle Tower, dedicated in 1912 by the Duke of Connaught to commemorate 150 years of representative government in Nova Scotia. The Mainland Common, in Clayton Park, is a modern park home to various sports and community facilities. Long Lake Provincial Park, comprising more than 2,000 hectares, was designated in 1984 and affords Halifax residents access to a scenic wilderness in close proximity to the urban communities.

Tourism

Halifax's tourism industry showcases Nova Scotia's culture, scenery and coastline. There are several museums and art galleries in downtown Halifax. The Canadian Museum of Immigration at Pier 21, an immigrant entry point prominent throughout the 1930s, 1940s, and 1950s, was opened to the public as a National Historic Site of Canada in 1999 and is the only national museum in the Atlantic provinces. The Maritime Museum of the Atlantic is a maritime museum containing extensive galleries including a large exhibit on the famous , over 70 small craft and a  steamship . In summertime the preserved World War II corvette  operates as a museum ship and Canada's naval memorial. The Art Gallery of Nova Scotia is housed in a 150-year-old building containing nearly 19,000 works of art. The Black Cultural Centre for Nova Scotia in Dartmouth reflects the region's rich ethnic heritage.

Halifax has numerous National Historic Sites, most notably Citadel Hill (Fort George). Just outside the urban area, the iconic Peggys Cove is internationally recognized and receives more than 600,000 visitors a year.

The waterfront in Downtown Halifax is the site of the Halifax Harbourwalk, a  boardwalk popular among tourists and locals alike. Many mid-sized ships dock here at one of the many wharfs. The harbourwalk is home to a Halifax Transit ferry terminal, hundreds of stores, Historic Properties, several office buildings, the Casino Nova Scotia, and several public squares where buskers perform, most prominently at the annual Halifax International Busker Festival every August.

Downtown Halifax, home to many small shops and vendors, is a major shopping area. It is also home to several shopping centres, including Scotia Square, Barrington Place Shops, and Maritime Mall. Numerous malls on Spring Garden Road, including the Park Lane Mall, are also located nearby. The area is home to approximately 200 restaurants and bars, offering a wide array of world cuisines. There are also more than 60 sidewalk cafes that open in the summer months. The nightlife is made up of bars and small music venues as well as Casino Nova Scotia, a large facility built partially over the water.

Cruise ships visit the province frequently. In 2015, the Port of Halifax welcomed 141 vessel calls with 222,309 passengers.

Media

Halifax is the Atlantic region's central point for radio broadcast and press media. CBC Television, CTV Television Network (CTV), and Global Television Network and other broadcasters all have important regional television concentrators in the municipality. CBC Radio has a major regional studio and there are also regional hubs for Rogers Radio and various private broadcast franchises, as well as a regional bureau for The Canadian Press/Broadcast News.

Halifax's print media is centred on its single daily newspaper, the broadsheet Chronicle Herald as well as two free newspapers, the daily commuter-oriented edition of Metro International and the free alternative arts weekly The Coast.

Halifax has several online daily newspapers. allNovaScotia is a daily, subscriber-only outlet which focuses on business and political news from across the province. HalifaxToday is a free news website, owned by Village Media, which originated from the now-defunct Local Xpress outlet created by the journalists of the Chronicle Herald during a 2016–2017 strike. The Halifax Examiner was founded by the former news editor of The Coast in 2014 and, like allNovaScotia, is supported through subscriptions.

From 1974 to 2008, Halifax had a second daily newspaper, the tabloid The Daily News, which still publishes several neighbourhood weekly papers such as The Bedford-Sackville Weekly News, The Halifax West-Clayton Park Weekly News and the Dartmouth-Cole Harbour Weekly News. These weekly papers compete with The Chronicle-Heralds weekly Community Heralds HRM West, HRM East, and HRM North.

 Sports 

Halifax is represented by two professional sports teams, with teams in the National Lacrosse League (NLL) and Canadian Premier League (CPL). Also, Halifax has a semi-professional sports team in the Quebec Major Junior Hockey League (QMJHL), which is part of the Canadian Hockey League (CHL).  

The city is also home to four universities that have athletic programmes.

The city's major sports venues include the Scotiabank Centre (formerly the Metro Centre), the Halifax Forum, the Wanderers Grounds and various university sports facilities, such as Huskies Stadium.

 Professional and semi-professional sports 

Halifax is home to the Halifax Mooseheads the semi-professional major junior hockey club of the Quebec Major Junior Hockey League (QMJHL). Founded in 1994 and began play in the Dilio Division of the QMJHL from the 1994–95 season, the Mooseheads were the first team from Atlantic Canada to join the QMJHL. In 2013 the Mooseheads capped a 74-win season (going 74-7-3-1) with a QMJHL’s President's Cup championship. Following the President’s Cup, while hosting the tournament, the Mooseheads also won the CHL’s 2013 Memorial Cup. They have appeared in the President's Cup Finals three additional times: 2003, 2005 and 2019. They also hosted the Memorial Cup tournaments two additional times in 2000 and 2019.

The Halifax Thunderbirds is the city's National Lacrosse League team. Relocated in September 2018 from Rochester, the Thunderbirds are Halifax’s newest professional team. Unfortunately on March 12, 2020, during their inaugural year, the season was cut short due to the COVID-19 pandemic. Although the team didn’t have the chance to finish their season, they were awarded two league awards: Defensive Player of the Year and Executive of the Year. After the 2020-2021 season was fully canceled, the team returned for their 2021-2022 season which they reached their first playoffs, where they were defeated by the Toronto Rock 14-13 in overtime in the conference semi-final.

Halifax’s second professional sports team are the HFX Wanderers FC and are part of Canada’s primary national soccer league, the Canadian Premier League. On May 25, 2018 the team was officially announced and that they would be playing at a temporary stadium on Halifax’s Wanderers Grounds. They played their first league game on April 28, 2019, in 1–0 away loss to Pacific FC.

The city had a team in the National Basketball League of Canada (NBL Canada) called the Halifax Hurricanes. The team succeeded the Halifax Rainmen who had previously played in the American Basketball Association and Premier Basketball League before joining the NBL Canada and later declaring bankruptcy in July 2015.   The Hurricanes won the NBL Canada championship in their inaugural season. Unfortunately the Hurricanes have since ceased operations, and as of November 2021, the team has left the NBL Canada.

The Halifax Crescents, an amateur and later, professional ice hockey team challenged for the Stanley Cup in 1900 but lost to the Montreal Shamrocks.

Halifax also had three teams in the American Hockey League between 1971 and 1993. The Nova Scotia Voyageurs, affiliated with the Montreal Canadiens, played from 1971 to 1984 and won 3 Calder Cups. The team then relocated to Sherbrooke, Quebec to become the Sherbrooke Canadiens.

The Nova Scotia Oilers replaced the Voyageurs in Halifax and were affiliated with the Edmonton Oilers. The Oilers played four seasons before relocating to Sydney, Cape Breton Island to become the Cape Breton Oilers. 

The Halifax Citadels, affiliated with the Quebec Nordiques then filled the void in 1988 and played until 1993, when they relocated to Cornwall, Ontario to become the Cornwall Aces.

 University sports 

Halifax is home to seven degree-granting post-secondary educational institutions with four of them having athletic programmes. Two of the schools, Dalhousie University and Saint Mary's University are part of the U Sports league. While Mount Saint Vincent University and University of King's College are apart of the Canadian Collegiate Athletic Association (CCAA).

Dalhousie University’s varsity team goes by the Tigers. They have teams for basketball, hockey, soccer, swimming, track and field, cross country running, and volleyball. The Tigers garnered a number of championships in the first decade of the 20th century, winning 63 AUS championships and two U Sports championships.

Halifax’s other U Sports university, located just down the street from Dalhousie, is Saint Mary's University with the moniker of the Huskies. Known for their football programme, the Huskies play at Huskies Stadium and won back-to-back Canadian University Football Championships (2001 & 2002), only the third university to do so. Huskies Stadium was used on June 11, 2005 to host an exhibition game between the Hamilton Tiger-Cats and the Toronto Argonauts of the CFL. The game was called "Touchdown Atlantic"

Finally, two of Halifax’s smaller universities are part of the Canadian Collegiate Athletic Association (CCAA). Mount Saint Vincent University, home to the Mystics, competes in the Atlantic Collegiate Athletic Association (ACAA), a member of the CCAA, in Women's & Men's Basketball, Women's & Men's Soccer, Cross Country and Women's Volleyball. The Mystics hold a championship titles in all sports, making them the most acclaimed team of the ACAA division. University of King's College is also a member of the ACAA. The varsity athletics teams at the University of King's College are named the Blue Devils. Sporting teams include men's and women's basketball, soccer, badminton and rugby, and women's volleyball.

From 1984 to 2007, the region was home to the CIS Men's Basketball Championship; the tournament was moved to Ottawa, Ontario, from 2008 to 2010 and returned to Halifax in 2011 and 2012.

 Events 
The city has hosted several major sporting events, including the 2003 World Junior Hockey Championship, 2003 Nokia Brier, the 2004 Women's World Ice Hockey Championships, the 2005 Canadian Olympic Curling Trials, and 2007 World Indoor Lacrosse Championship.  Other major sports events hosted by Halifax include:
 2004 IIHF Women's World Championship (Co-hosted with Dartmouth)
 2008 IIHF World Championship (Co-hosted with Quebec City)
 2011 Canada Winter Games
 2020 IIHF Women's World Ice Hockey Championships along with Truro, but the tournament was cancelled due to COVID-19.
 2023 World Junior Ice Hockey Championships (Co-hosted with Moncton)

Halifax was selected in 2006 as the host municipality in Canada's bid for the 2014 Commonwealth Games but withdrew on March 8, 2007, well before the November 9, 2007 selection date, citing financial uncertainties.

 Amateur and club sports   
Halifax is also home to several rugby clubs; the Dartmouth PigDogs, the Eastern Shore Rugby Football Club, the Halifax Rugby Football Club, the Halifax Tars, and the Riverlake Ramblers. The Halifax Gaels are the local Hurling and Gaelic Football team that compete in Canadian GAA events.

Halifax has various recreational areas, including ocean and lake beaches and rural and urban parks. It has a host of organized community intramural sports at various facilities. Public schools and post-secondary institutions offer varsity and intramural sports.

Demographics

 Halifax CMA 

 Halifax Regional Municipality 

The 2021 census reported that immigrants (individuals born outside Canada) comprise 50,595 persons or 12.6% of the total population of Halifax. Of the total immigrant population, the top countries of origin were United Kingdom (6,345 persons or 12.5%), India (4,785 persons or 9.5%), China (3,740 persons or 7.4%), United States of America (3,545 persons or 7.0%), Philippines (3,415 persons or 6.7%), Syria (2,085 persons or 4.1%), Nigeria (1,625 persons or 3.2%), Lebanon (1,340 persons or 2.6%), South Korea (1,020 persons or 2.0%), and Iran (980 persons or 1.9%).

 Ethnicity 

Note: Totals greater than 100% due to multiple origin responses.

LanguageMother tongue language (2021)Religion

St. Paul's Church is the oldest Christian church in Halifax.
Halifax is a religiously diverse municipality, and has several landmark religious institutions: 
St. Mary's Basilica (Halifax, Nova Scotia)
The New Horizons Baptist Church
St. George's (Round) Church, 
United Rockingham Church
St. Andrew's United Church
the Ummah Mosque and Community Centre
the Centre for Islamic Development
the Vedanta Ashram Hindu Temple
the Atlantic Theravada Buddhist Temple
The Maritime Sikh Society
Beth Israel Synagogue
the Shaar Shalom Synagogue
and the Universalist Unitarian Church. 
Halifax also houses the Atlantic School of Theology for religious studies.Religion (2021)'''

 Halifax urban area 

As of 2021, the population centre (urban area) of Halifax housed 348,634 people living in 154,883 of its 162,336 total private dwellings.

Between 2016-and-2021, the urban area (population centre) and municipal areas experienced strong growth. Over that time-frame; the municipality added 36,688 people (an increase of over 9.1%), and the urban area (population centre) added 31,300 people (an increase of over 9.8%).

Economy

The urban area of Halifax is a major economic centre in eastern Canada with a large concentration of government services and private sector companies. Halifax serves as the business, banking, government and cultural centre for the Maritime region. The largest employment sectors within the municipality include trade (36,400 jobs), health care and social
assistance (31,800 jobs), professional services (19,000 jobs), education (17,400 jobs), and public administration (15,800 jobs). The Halifax economy is growing, with the Conference Board of Canada predicting strong 3.0% GDP growth for 2015.

Major employers and economic generators include the Department of National Defence, the Port of Halifax, Irving Shipbuilding, the Nova Scotia Health Authority, IMP Group, Bell Aliant, Emera, the Bedford Institute of Oceanography, government, banks, and universities. The municipality has a growing concentration of manufacturing industries and is becoming a major multi-modal transportation hub through growth at the port, the Halifax Stanfield International Airport, and improving rail and highway connections. Halifax is one of Canada's top four container ports in terms of the volume of cargo handled. A real estate boom in recent years has led to numerous new property developments, including the gentrification of some former working-class areas.

Agriculture, fishing, mining, forestry and natural gas extraction are major resource industries found in the rural areas of the municipality. Halifax's largest agricultural district is in the Musquodoboit Valley; the total number of farms in Halifax is 150, of which 110 are family-owned. Fishing harbours are located along all coastal areas with some having an independent harbour authority, such as the Sheet Harbour Industrial Port, and others being managed as small craft harbours under the federal Fisheries and Oceans Canada.

Other resource industries in Halifax include the natural gas fields off the coast of Sable Island, as well as clay, gold, gypsum, limestone, and shale extraction in rural areas of the mainland portion of the municipality. Limestone is extracted in the Musquodoboit Valley and gold is extracted in Moose River.

Government

The Halifax Regional Municipality is governed by a mayor (elected at large) and a sixteen-person council. Councillors are elected by geographic district, with municipal elections occurring every four years. The current mayor of Halifax is Mike Savage. The Halifax Regional Council is responsible for all facets of municipal government, including the Halifax Regional Police, Halifax Public Libraries, Halifax Fire and Emergency, Halifax Regional Water Commission, parks and recreation, civic addressing, public works, waste management, and planning and development. The provincial legislation that provides governance oversight to the municipality is the Halifax Regional Municipality Charter. The municipality has a proposed operating budget of $869 million for 2015–2016.

The municipality also has three community councils that consider local matters. Each community council comprises five or six regional councillors representing neighbouring districts. Most community council decisions are subject to final approval by regional council.

As the capital of Nova Scotia, Halifax is also the meeting place of the Nova Scotia House of Assembly, the oldest assembly in Canada and the site of the first responsible government in British North America. The legislature meets in Province House, a nearly 200-year-old National Historic Site in downtown Halifax hailed as one of the finest examples of Palladian architecture in North America.

Education

Halifax has a well-developed network of public and private schools, providing instruction from grade primary to grade twelve; 136 public schools are administered by the Halifax Regional School Board, while six public schools are administered by the Conseil scolaire acadien provincial. The municipality's fourteen private schools are operated independently.

The municipality is also home to the following post-secondary educational institutions: Dalhousie University, University of King's College, Mount Saint Vincent University, NSCAD University, Nova Scotia Community College, the Halifax campus of Université Sainte-Anne, Saint Mary's University, the Atlantic School of Theology, and several private institutions. The largest of these, Dalhousie University, is Atlantic Canada's premier research-intensive university ranking 7th in Maclean's and 228th in the world. This school is host to most of the province's professional schools while other institutions focus primarily though not exclusively on undergraduate education. The plethora of university and college students contributes to the vibrant youth culture in the region, as well as making it a major centre for university education in eastern Canada.

Transportation

Air
Halifax Stanfield International Airport serves Halifax and most of the province, providing scheduled flights to domestic and international destinations. The airport served 4,083,188 passengers in 2017, making it Canada's eighth busiest airport by passenger traffic. Shearwater, part of CFB Halifax, is the air base for maritime helicopters employed by the Royal Canadian Navy and is located on the eastern side of Halifax Harbour.

Cycling
In recent years, the municipality has also begun to place increased emphasis on developing bicycling infrastructure. Halifax has developed  of bikeways,  of which are dedicated bicycle lanes.

Road
The urban core is linked by the Angus L. Macdonald and A. Murray MacKay suspension bridges, as well as the network of 100-series highways which function as expressways. The Armdale traffic circle is an infamous choke point for vehicle movement in the western part of the urban core, especially at rush hour.

Public transit
Public transit is provided by Halifax Transit, which operates standard bus routes, regional express bus routes, as well as the pedestrian-only Halifax-Dartmouth Ferry Service. Established in 1752, the municipality's ferry service is the oldest continuously running salt water ferry service in North America.

Rail

The Halifax Port Authority's various shipping terminals constitute the eastern terminus of Canadian National Railway's transcontinental network. Via Rail Canada provides overnight passenger rail service from the Halifax Railway Station three days a week to Montreal with the Ocean, a train equipped with sleeper cars that stops in major centres along the way, such as Moncton. The Halifax Railway Station also serves as the terminus for Maritime Bus, which serves destinations across the Maritimes.

Water
Halifax Harbour is a major port used by numerous shipping lines, administered by the Halifax Port Authority. The Royal Canadian Navy and the Canadian Coast Guard have major installations along prominent sections of coastline in both Halifax and Dartmouth. The harbour is also home to a public ferry service connecting downtown Halifax to two locations in Dartmouth. Sheet Harbour is the other major port in the municipality and serves industrial users on the Eastern Shore.

Sister cities
  Hakodate, Japan (1982). The cities chose to twin because they both have star forts and are both maritime ports. Halifax has donated many fir trees to the annual Hakodate Christmas Fantasy festival.
  Campeche, Mexico (1999). Campeche was chosen because, like Halifax, it is "a capital of a state" and is "a city of similar size to Halifax on or near the coast having rich historical tradition".
  Norfolk, Virginia, United States (2006). Norfolk was chosen because, like Halifax, its economy "depends heavily on the presence of the Armed Forces, and both cities are very proud of their military history".

Notable Haligonians

See also

 Halifax (electoral district), a federal electoral district since Confederation
 Halifax Regional Search and Rescue
 Halifax West, a federal electoral district since 1979
 List of municipalities in Nova Scotia

Notes

References

Further reading
 Laffoley, Steven (2007). Hunting Halifax: In Search of History, Mystery and Murder''. Pottersfield Press. .

External links

 

 
1749 establishments in the British Empire
Geographic regions of Nova Scotia
Populated coastal places in Canada
Populated places established in 1996
Port cities and towns on the Canadian Atlantic coast
Regional municipalities in Nova Scotia